One Day is the debut studio album by Dutch musician and singer-songwriter Peter Toussaint, who has been living in Pretoria since 2003. His first release as a solo artist, it was released on 11 December 2017. The album is an instrumental album and a concept album, musically going through a full day.
As a bonus track, there is the song "Home" which follows after Moonlight.

Critical reception
Initial reaction for One Day from music critics has been highly favorable. Lenore Germeshuys of The Flow described the album as "A very good listen."

Clive Fisher of Guitar Ninja wrote:"One Day is a great album created by awesome musicians..."

Pedro Barbosa of Running Wolf's Rant described the album as "chilled,melodic and relaxing."

Darren Johnston of GeoGravity wrote “‘One Day’ isn’t a string of songs loosely slapped together onto a record; it is a meticulously-curated and detail-driven thematic story, of which its songs seamlessly segue into each other.”

Track listing

Personnel
Taken from album liner notes.

 Peter Toussaint – acoustic and electric guitars, keyboards, vocals
 Franco Jamneck – bass guitar, trumpet
 Riaan van Rensburg – drums, percussion
 Rika du Plessis - cello
 Johan Scheppel - violin
 Illimar Neitz – producer, mixing
 Stephan Bester - mastering

References

2017 debut albums